Brian Woodburn Cavanaugh is a United States Marine Corps lieutenant general who has served as the Commander of the United States Marine Corps Forces Command and Fleet Marine Force, Atlantic since August 30, 2022. He most recently served as Commanding General of the 1st Marine Aircraft Wing from 2021 to 2022, and previously served as the Assistant Deputy Commandant for Programs of the United States Marine Corps. 

Cavanaugh attended the United States Naval Academy, graduating with a B.S. degree in mechanical engineering in 1990. After completing flight school, he was designated a naval aviator in 1992. Cavanaugh later earned an M.B.A. degree from Webster University and an M.S. degree in national resource strategy from the Industrial College of the Armed Forces at the National Defense University.

References

External links

Year of birth missing (living people)
Living people
Place of birth missing (living people)
People from Baltimore
United States Naval Academy alumni
African-American United States Navy personnel
United States Naval Aviators
Recipients of the Air Medal
Webster University alumni
Dwight D. Eisenhower School for National Security and Resource Strategy alumni
Recipients of the Meritorious Service Medal (United States)
Recipients of the Legion of Merit
United States Marine Corps generals
Recipients of the Defense Superior Service Medal
21st-century African-American people